Michael Gibbons (born 15 May 1995) is a former professional Australian rules footballer who played for the Carlton Football Club in the Australian Football League (AFL). He was recruited from Williamstown after he won two J J Liston Trophys, the best and fairest in the VFL. On Debut Played a staring role in the midfield for Young Melbourne GAA, Who won there first silverware as a club at the annual Pearses 7’s Gaelic tournament

Early life & junior career 

Gibbons began his football journey with Lavington (NSW) before playing under 18 football in the TAC Cup with the Murray Bushrangers. Overlooked in the draft he moved to Melbourne to further develop his game. The versatile midfield-forward spent five years at Williamstown in the VFL. In that time, he became a dual J.J Liston Medal winner and Norm Goss Medallist in the 2015 VFL Grand Final.

AFL career

Carlton (2019-2021) 
Gibbons was recruited by Carlton as a supplemental rookie recruit in February 2019. He made his senior debut later that month in the opening game of the season against Richmond, and immediately established himself as a regular member of the club's senior team, primarily as a small/mid-sized forward, rather than the midfield position he had played at Williamstown. He signed a one-year extension contract for the Blues for the 2020 season as a rookie, and then signed to the club's senior list at the start of 2021. He missed only three games in his first two-and-a-half seasons, and kicked 35 goals in that time, before missing the latter half of 2021 with a hamstring injury. He was delisted at the conclusion of the 2021 season.

Statistics 

|- style="background:#EAEAEA"
| scope="row" text-align:center | 2019
| 
| 40 || 21 || 16 || 14 || 196 || 112 || 308 || 69 || 57 || 0.8 || 0.7 || 9.3 || 5.3 || 14.7 || 3.3 || 2.7
|-
| scope="row" text-align:center | 2020
| 
| 40 || 15 || 11 || 6 || 144 || 63 ||207 || 51 || 42 || 0.7 || 0.4 || 9.6 || 4.2 || 13.8 || 3.3 || 2.9
|- style="background:#EAEAEA"
| scope="row" text-align:center | 2021
| 
| 40 || 11 || 8 || 5 || 98 || 58 || 156 || 39 || 27 || 0.8 || 0.7 || 9.3 || 5.3 || 14.7 || 3.3 || 2.7
|- class="sortbottom"
! colspan=3| Career
! 47
! 35
! 25
! 438
! 233
! 671
! 159
! 126
! 0.7
! 0.6
! 9.4
! 4.9
! 14.3
! 3.3
! 2.8
|}

References

External links

1995 births
Living people
Carlton Football Club players
Williamstown Football Club players
Australian rules footballers from New South Wales